The Headquarters Park Historic District encompasses the summer headquarters for the Leo Sheep Company, which focused on wool production, and the Rocky Mountain Sheep Company, which concentrated on lamb production, in Carbon County, Wyoming. The area was one of the major summer sheep and lamb-herding regions of Wyoming. Both companies were founded by Lee Emmit Vivion in 1903 and functioned for more than 65 years.

The Headquarters Park Historic District was listed on the National Register of Historic Places in on April 17, 2012.

References

External links
Headquarters Park Historic district at the Wyoming State Historic Preservation Office

National Register of Historic Places in Carbon County, Wyoming
Historic districts on the National Register of Historic Places in Wyoming